is a railway station on the Nanao Line in Nakanoto, Kashima District, Ishikawa Prefecture, Japan, operated by the West Japan Railway Company (JR West), opened in 1898.

Lines

Station layout
The station consists of two opposed ground-level side platforms connected by a footbridge. The station is unattended.

Platforms

Adjacent stations

History
The station opened on April 24, 1898. With the privatization of Japanese National Railways (JNR) on April 1, 1987, the station came under the control of JR West. The station building was rebuilt in May 2005.

Surrounding area

Kanemaru Post Office

See also
 List of railway stations in Japan

External links

  

Railway stations in Ishikawa Prefecture
Stations of West Japan Railway Company
Railway stations in Japan opened in 1898
Nanao Line
Nakanoto, Ishikawa